Orzu (also Romanized as Orzū; also known as Ārenzū, Ārezū, and Ārzū) is a village in Haparu Rural District, in the Central District of Bagh-e Malek County, Khuzestan Province, Iran. At the 2006 census, its population was 192, in 34 families.

References 

Populated places in Bagh-e Malek County